North Korea's defence industry predates the Korean War, but has emerged as a major supplier to the North Korean armed forces beginning in the 1970s, but increasingly so after the fall of the Soviet Union and to supplement those purchased from China. Most equipment produced are copies of Soviet and Chinese built military hardware.

Military factories

Tanks, arms, and missiles
 First Machine Industry Bureau - supplier of machine guns, likely Type 62 Light Machine Gun and Type 73 Light Machine Gun
 Ryu Kyong-su Tank Factory - Sinhung South Hamgyong Province
 Second Machine Industry Bureau - Sŏngch'ŏn-kun, South Pyongan Province - builds Chonma-ho and Pokpung-ho MBT; likely Chuch'e-Po and Koksan artillery gun
 Third Machine Industry Bureau: Multi-stage rockets
 Fourth Machine Industry Bureau: Guided missiles
 Fifth Machine Industry Bureau: Nuclear, biological, and chemical weapons
 Tokhyon Munitions Plant

Naval
 Bong Dao Bo Shipyards, Sinpo - located on the mainland across from Mayang-do Naval base - builder of the Sang-O and Gorae class Submarines.
 Mayang-do Naval Shipyards,  in northeast coast - maintenance facility with graving dock; has built some ships for the navy (12 Romeo class submarines)
 Najin Shipyards - Kowan-Class submarine rescue ship, Soho class frigates and Najin class frigates
 Nampho Shipyards - located on west coast and builds small- and medium-size submarines (Sang-O and Yugo?)
 Wonsan Shipyards - located on east coast and builds small- and medium-size submarines (Sang-O and Yugo?)
 Yukdaeso-ri Shipyards - located on west coast and has built midget submarines (Yugo-class submarines or Yono-class submarines) since the 1960s
 Sixth Machine Industry Bureau: Battleships and submarines

Aircraft
There are no known indigenous aircraft built in North Korea, factories supply components or parts for current aircraft flown such as for Tumansky RD-9 turbojet engine used by Mikoyan-Gurevich MiG-19 and Shenyang J-6.

Another is additional sub systems for aircraft such as Tactical air navigation system that for example were known to be exported to Syria.

 Ch’onjin - small factory used to build spare parts and rebuild aircraft for the Air Force.
 Taechon - used to build spare parts and rebuild aircraft for the Air Force.
 Panghyon - North Korea's primary aircraft assembly, repair and research facility established in the mid-1980s.
 Seventh Machine Industry Bureau: Production and purchase of war planes

Space
 National Aerospace Development Administration

References

Bibliography

External links
 North Korean Army Equipment
 North Korean Air Force Equipment

North Korea
Defence companies of North Korea
Military equipment of North Korea